Anthony Russo (December 22, 1946 – April 19, 2021) was the 38th mayor of Hoboken, New Jersey, serving from 1993 to 2001. He won two terms, but failed to get enough votes to get a third term. (David Roberts beat him in 2001 when he got 6,064 votes and Russo got 4,759 votes.)

Biography
In the 1993 election that got him into office, Russo beat his main opponent, Ira Karasick, by 7,023 to 5,623 votes. During his two terms, people who were loyal to revitalizing the city of Hoboken were put into every facet of its government including the Hoboken municipal boards.

Russo was credited with hiring top-flight Municipal directors with the goal of shrinking and eventually eliminating Hoboken's structural budget deficit and expanding the tax base.  Investment in Hoboken's housing stock soared under Russo's administration and the long dormant waterfront was built with first class office, hotel and residential space. Part of the waterfront redevelopment plan included the creation of large waterfront parks, including Pier A and Frank Sinatra Park. This gave Hoboken residents their first public access to the Hudson River waterfront in decades.

In 2000, it was discovered that Russo had cancer, in the form of a brain tumor. His medical team said he would only live another few months, but his fighting spirit and the skill of his medical team were successful at fighting off the cancer. 

Councilman David Roberts defeated Russo for mayor in the 2001 election. Roberts capitalized on Russo's illness and a major coalition of Russo foes throughout Hoboken and Hudson county circles. In 2002, the tumor went into remission, and because of this the doctors told Russo he could run for office again. He ran for 3rd Ward Council, but had to tearfully resign shortly after being elected because the cancer reappeared. Unrelated to his cancer, Russo died on April 18, 2021, at the age of 74.

References

Further reading

1947 births
2021 deaths
American people of Italian descent
Mayors of Hoboken, New Jersey
New Jersey city council members